Okavango African Orchestra is a Canadian musical group from Toronto, Ontario, who won the Juno Award for World Music Album of the Year at the Juno Awards of 2017 for their self-titled debut album. The group aims to celebrate and promote the diversity of African music, by recording and performing music in many different African styles and incorporating many of Africa's unique musical instruments.

They formed in 2010 through the Batuki Music Society, a Toronto-based organization which promotes traditional African arts and music in the city. The group's original members were Daniel Nebiat on krar, Sadio Sissokho on kora, Waleed Abdulhamid on gimbri, Nuudi Kooshin on kaban, Pasipamire Gunguwo on mbira, Donné Robert on guitar, and Walter MacLean on percussion. The current lineup as of 2018 includes Nebiat, Sissokho, Robert, Ebenezer Agyekum, Kofi Ackah, Nicolas Simbananiye and Tichaona Maredza.

References

Canadian world music groups
Musical groups from Toronto
Musical groups established in 2010
Black Canadian musical groups
Juno Award for Global Music Album of the Year winners
2010 establishments in Ontario